Mario Colarossi (15 November 1929 – 19 September 2010) was an Italian sprinter. He competed in the men's 100 metres at the 1956 Summer Olympics.

References

External links
 

1929 births
2010 deaths
Athletes (track and field) at the 1956 Summer Olympics
Italian male sprinters
Olympic athletes of Italy
Place of birth missing